The Industries, Commerce and Investment Department (ICID) is a department of the Government of Punjab in Pakistan. The department promotes industrial development, trade and investment.

The department is headed by an elected minister as well as a secretary. Mian Muhammad Aslam Iqbal is the Provincial Minister of Punjab for Industries, Commerce and Investment since 27 August 2018.

Related Departments

Directorate of Industries

Punjab Consumer Protection Council 
District Consumer Protection Councils and Consumer Courts were established in eleven districts of the province under The Punjab Consumer Protection Act 2005.  Their goal is to resolve consumer issues.

Punjab Printing and Stationery Press 
The Punjab Printing and Stationery Press is an attached organization. It provides printing and binding services to government organizations and has two presses:

 Government Printing Press, Lahore was established in 1878.
 Government Printing Press, Bahawalpur was established in 1869.

Autonomous Bodies

Punjab Small Industries Corporation 
Punjab Small Industries Corporation was established in 1973 under The Punjab Small Industries Corporation Act. The body contributes to small industrial development in the province.

Companies

Punjab Board of Investment and Trade 

Punjab Board of Investment & Trade (PBIT) is the trade and investment promotion agency.

Punjab Industrial Estate - Development And Management Company 
Punjab Industrial Estates Development and Marketing Company was established in 2003 to develop and manage Industrial estates.

Faisalabad Industrial Estate Development Management Company 
Faisalabad Industrial Estate Development & Management Company (FIEDMC) was established under the companies ordinance 1984 to develop Industrial estates.

Special Institutions

Technical Education & Vocational Training Authority

Punjab Prices Supply Board 
Established under The Price Control and Prevention of Profiteering and Hoarding Act, 1977 to check and monitor the prices of essential items.

See also 
 Ministry of Industries and Production
 Ministry of Commerce
 Economy of Punjab
 Quaid-E-Azam Business Park

External links
 Industries, Commerce and Investment Department
 Punjab Board of Investment & Trade
 Faisalabad Industrial Estate Development & Management Company
 Punjab Industrial Estates Development and Management Company
 Technical Education & Vocational Training Authority
 Punjab Industrial Estates Development and Management Company

References

Departments of Government of Punjab, Pakistan
Economy of Punjab, Pakistan
Punjab
Punjab, Pakistan